Arkady Andreyevich Bochkaryov (24 February 1931 – 29 March 1988) was a Soviet basketball player. He was a member of the Soviet team between 1953 and 1959 and won a silver medal at the 1956 Summer Olympics, as well as the European titles in 1957 and 1959. After retirement he worked as a sport functionary with the Soviet Army.

References

1931 births
1988 deaths
Olympic basketball players of the Soviet Union
Basketball players at the 1956 Summer Olympics
Olympic silver medalists for the Soviet Union
FIBA EuroBasket-winning players
Soviet men's basketball players
1959 FIBA World Championship players
Russian men's basketball players
Olympic medalists in basketball
Medalists at the 1956 Summer Olympics